The 2010–11 UCLA Bruins men's basketball team represented the University of California, Los Angeles during the 2010–11 NCAA Division I men's basketball season. The Bruins were led by head coach Ben Howland and played their home games at Pauley Pavilion. They finished the conference season in second place (13–5), and were a 2-seed at the 2011 Pacific-10 Conference men's basketball tournament, where they lost to 7-seed Oregon in the quarterfinals. They received an at-large bid in the 2011 NCAA Division I men's basketball tournament as the #7 seeded team in the Southeast Region, where they defeated #10 seed Michigan State before falling to #2 seed Florida in the third round. They finished the season 23–11.

Recruiting class

Roster

Schedule

|-
!colspan=9 style=|Exhibition
|-

|-

|-
!colspan=9 style=|Regular Season
|-

|-

|-

|-

|-
!colspan=9 style=| Pac-10 tournament
|-

|-
!colspan=9 style=| NCAA tournament

Rankings

Honors
Malcolm Lee, Tyler Honeycutt, and Reeves Nelson were named to the All-Pac-10 first team.  The three selection were the most of any team in the Pac-10 Conference. It's the first time the Bruins have had that many first-team selections since Toby Bailey, Jelani McCoy and Charles O'Bannon were picked in 1997.

Lee was also selected to the Pac-10 All-Defensive team, while Joshua Smith was named to the Pac-10 All-Freshmen team.

See also
 2010–11 NCAA Division I men's basketball rankings

Notes
 Tyus Edney joined the team as director of basketball operations on August 2, 2010
 October 28, 2010 - The Bruins were picked to finish 3rd, with one first place vote, in the conference by the media in the annual preseason poll.
 December 10, 2010 – guard Matt Carlino left the team and would transfer to play at another school.
 The 66-59 win over St. John's on February 5, 2011 was UCLA'S first in seven tries (UCLA hadn't beaten the Red Storm since Dec. 1968).
 February 26, 2011 – Tyler Trapani, John Wooden's great-grandson scored the last two points of the last men's basketball game in Pauley Pavilion before the building goes into renovation for a year. The final shot is recorded as "Trapani (Wooden's great-grandson) left side layin off Haley's (Jack) missed 3-pt. try."
 March 17, 2011 - UCLA is making its 44th appearance in the NCAA basketball tournament. The Bruins have 99 tournament wins, third on the all-time list. Ben Howland took the Bruins to the tournament six times in his eight years as head coach and the Final Four in 2006, 2007 and 2008.
 March 28, 2011 – Tyler Honeycutt announced that he will declare for the 2011 NBA draft and will hire an agent.
April 1, 2011 - Assistant Coach Scott Duncan left the team to become the associate head coach at Wyoming.
April 12, 2011 - Lee announced he would forgo his final year of college eligibility and hire an agent and enter the 2011 NBA draft.

References

UCLA Bruins men's basketball seasons
UCLA
UCLA
NCAA
NCAA